Edward Charles Pelham-Clinton, 10th Duke of Newcastle-under-Lyne (18 August 1920 – 25 December 1988), was an English lepidopterist and military officer as well as duke for less than two months at the end of his life, inheriting the titles from a third cousin.

Education and career
Pelham-Clinton was the son of Guy Edward Pelham-Clinton, an army officer and a grandson of Lord Charles Clinton, who was a younger son of Henry Pelham-Clinton, 4th Duke of Newcastle. He was educated at Eton, and Trinity College, Oxford, and served as an officer in the Royal Artillery during the Second World War, rising to the rank of captain. He was also mentioned in dispatches. His younger brother, Alastair Pelham-Clinton, was a Royal Air Force Flying Officer and died in 1943 aged twenty.

He had been interested in lepidopterology from a young age and had specialised in entomology at Cambridge University. An expert in the subject, from 1960 to 1980 Pelham-Clinton was Deputy Keeper of the Royal Scottish Museum, in Edinburgh. He acted as an associate editor of six volumes of the series The Moths and Butterflies of Great Britain and Ireland, wherein he wrote about Tineidae, Choreutidae and Glyphipterigidae and was working on Elachistidae at the time of his death. A building in Dinton Pastures Country Park was named after him by the British Entomological and Natural History Society, of which he had been a member.

Brief succession to dukedom and earldom
Pelham-Clinton succeeded his third cousin in the earldom and dukedom in November 1988. He died one month and 21 days later, aged 68, unmarried. As all other heirs male from the second duke's line had died, the dukedom became extinct, but his title of Earl of Lincoln was inherited by a very distant kinsman. He left an estate valued for probate at £2,222,203, and his stated usual abode was Furzeleigh House, Axminster.

References

1920 births
1988 deaths
20th-century English nobility
English entomologists
010
Edward
Edward
Alumni of Trinity College, Oxford
People educated at Eton College
Royal Artillery officers
20th-century British zoologists
British Army personnel of World War II